Santolina rosmarinifolia, the holy flax, is a species of flowering plant in the daisy family Asteraceae, native to south western Europe.

The Latin specific epithet rosmarinifolia describes the leaves' passing resemblance to those of rosemary.

In cultivation it is useful as groundcover or as an edging plant for sunny, well-drained situations. It dislikes winter wetness, and can be short-lived. The cultivar ‘Lemon Fizz’ and the dwarf cultivar S. rosmarinifolia subsp. rosmarinifolia 'Primrose Gem' have gained the Royal Horticultural Society's Award of Garden Merit.

Also known as olive herb or Wadi tops, the leaves of S. rosmarinifolia can be used in Mediterranean dishes and cocktails to add an olive-like flavour.

References

J. Rodriguez-Oubiña and S. Ortiz (2008). A new subspecies of Santolina rosmarinifolia L.(Asteraceae) from serpentine soils in Central Galicia (NW Iberian Peninsula), Botanical Journal of the Linnean Society, Volume 111 Issue 4.

Anthemideae
Plants described in 1753
Taxa named by Carl Linnaeus
Flora of Algeria